Caspar Phillipson (born 13 January 1971) is a Danish actor who has performed onscreen, onstage, and as a voice actor, predominantly in Scandinavian productions. Phillipson is best known in the English-speaking world for his portrayal of John F. Kennedy in the 2016 film Jackie. Although Phillipson appears in Jackie for only ten minutes, his resemblance to Kennedy has been considered unusually striking. Phillipson has subsequently portrayed Kennedy in a short film, in live performances of Kennedy's speeches, in the TV series Project Blue Book and in the 2022 Marilyn Monroe biopic Blonde.

Biography 

Phillipson has worked as a stage actor, screen actor, and voice actor. As a voice actor, Phillipson has dubbed roles from English-language films into Danish, including revoicing Johnny Depp as Willy Wonka in Charlie and the Chocolate Factory (2005). Phillipson has appeared in Scandinavian productions for the screen, including the television series The Bridge and Borgen.

Phillipson portrayed John F. Kennedy in Jackie (2016), his first role in an English-language film. He first auditioned for the part by video from Istanbul while appearing in a stage production of Hamlet. To audition in person for Jackie in Paris, Phillipson claimed sick leave from a Danish stage production called Don't Touch Nefertiti, missing five sold-out performances in a role that had been specially written for him. The Danish theater company took Phillipson to court and, in January 2017, the company was awarded  for the inconvenience he had caused the theater.

Although Phillipson appeared for less than ten minutes in Jackie, the press noted his close resemblance to Kennedy. The Washington Post commented on the resemblance after photos from the film's set were released: "That thatch of hair, those white teeth, the smile lines around the eyes — all very Kennedyesque. He might not be familiar to U.S. audiences, but he's far more visually similar to the former prez than other actors who’ve played JFK in recent memory, including James Marsden in The Butler (2013), Greg Kinnear in the 2011 TV miniseries The Kennedys and Rob Lowe in 2013's Killing Kennedy." Prior to auditioning for the part, Phillipson said his resemblance to Kennedy had only been noticed when he spent time in the United States: "I did a workshop years ago with Frank Corsaro, this iconic American teacher — he was the leader of Actors Studio — and suddenly, in the middle of a different scene, he said in this gruff voice, 'You have to do Kennedy one day. You just have to.'" Following Corsaro's advice, Phillipson practiced speeches by Kennedy and his brother Robert F. Kennedy, who he believed he more closely resembled.

Jackie casting director Mathilde Snodgrass said, "There had been an actor in Los Angeles who had done JFK for 10 or 15 years. He was in everything. But he was getting too old now. I thought, if Caspar could come with us, then he could be the next one. He could be the guy". After the film's release, Phillipson appeared in live performances as Kennedy alongside Anders Agner Pedersen, a Danish biographer of Kennedy; Pedersen provided historical context for a Kennedy speech before Phillipson delivered it. The actor delivered notable speeches by Kennedy such as his inaugural address, his 1963 American University speech, and his 1963 West Berlin speech. Phillipson reprised the role of Kennedy again in a short film, performing a "lost" speech written for the president to deliver on 22 November 1963, the date of his assassination. Phillipson's delivery of the speech was filmed at the 2017 COLCOA Film Festival and released as The Speech JFK Never Gave. He played Kennedy again in the 2022 film Blonde.

Filmography

Film

Television

References

External links 

1977 births
Living people
20th-century Danish male actors
21st-century Danish male actors
Danish male film actors
Danish male stage actors